BTS, the Best (stylized in all caps) is the second Japanese-language compilation album by South Korean boy band BTS. It was released on June 16, 2021, through Big Hit Music, Universal Music Japan sublabel Virgin Music and Def Jam Recordings. The album is a compilation of their previous two Japanese-language studio albums, Face Yourself (2018) and Map of the Soul: 7 – The Journey (2020). It was a commercial success in Japan, reaching number one on the Oricon Albums Chart, and earned the biggest first week sales for an album in 2021 domestically. BTS became the first Korean male group to surpass the 1 million sales mark for an album in the country.

Background
BTS announced the release of a new Japanese song, "Film Out" on February 16, 2021. The song was written by BTS member Jungkook in collaboration with Iyori Shimizu, the vocalist of Japanese rock power trio Back Number. It is slated to serve as the ending theme song of the movie Signal the Movie Cold Case Investigation Unit (2021). On March 26, the band released the music video teaser of the song and simultaneously announced the release of a new Japanese-language album, BTS, the Best. The track list was also announced simultaneously. The album contains all of the band's previous Japanese releases since 2017, while including their English-language 2020 single, "Dynamite" as a bonus track. Seven versions of the album had been announced with various supportive materials in each version, such as different posters, photo cards and artwork.

Commercial performance
BTS, the Best debuted at number one on Oricon's Daily Album Chart dated June 15, 2021, with 571,589 physical copies sold in a single day to become the best-selling album of the year upon release. It debuted atop the Weekly Albums Chart issue dated June 28, 2021, for the period ending June 20, with 782,369 copies sold, recording the highest first week sales by a male foreign artist, and the second-highest first week sales for a foreign artist in Oricon chart history—Mariah Carey's greatest hits album #1's sold 1.047 million copies its opening week in 1998. The album spent three consecutive weeks at number one on the Oricon chart and sold over 885,000 copies in that time. It additionally topped the corresponding issue of Oricon's Digital Album Chart for its release week with 7,603 digital sales, and debuted at number-one on Billboard Japans Hot Albums chart with 807,056 copies sold.

On December 22, Oricon announced that BTS, the Best was the best-selling physical album of 2021 in Japan with sales of 992,837 copies per data aggregated during the period dated December 14, 2020 to December 12, 2021. BTS are the first group in Oricon history, the first foreign artist in 37 years since Michael Jackson with Thriller (sold 575,000 copies 1984), and the third foreign artist overall following Elvis Presley in 1971 (sold 225,000 copies of "You Don't Have to Say You Love Me") and the aforementioned Jackson, to top the year-end album sales ranking. The album was additionally the fifth best-performing digital album of the year, with 21,082 downloads. In January 2022, the album surpassed sales of 1 million copies on Oricon, making it the first by a South Korean group in history to do so, and the first by a foreign act in over 16 years since BoA's Best of Soul (2005).

According to the International Federation of the Phonographic Industry's (IFPI) annual music report for 2021, BTS, the Best was the fourth best-selling album of the year globally, with 1.52 million copies sold.

Accolades 
In March 2022, the RIAJ announced the winners of the 36th Japan Gold Disc Awards for 2021. BTS, the Best won Album of the Year and Best 3 Albums in the Asia category.

Track listing
All Japanese translations  by KM-MARKIT.

Notes:
 "Fake Love", "Idol" and "On" are stylized in all caps.

Charts

Weekly charts

Monthly charts

Year-end charts

Certifications

Release history

See also
Album era
List of Oricon number-one albums of 2021
List of Billboard Japan Hot Albums number ones of 2021
List of K-pop albums on the Billboard charts

Notes

References 

2021 compilation albums
BTS albums
Universal Music Japan compilation albums
Def Jam Recordings compilation albums
Japanese-language compilation albums
Virgin Records compilation albums